The 1990 Davidson Wildcats football team represented Davidson College as an independent during the 1990 NCAA Division III football season. Led by fifth-year head coach Dave Fagg, the Wildcats compiled an overall record of 5–3. Davidson defeated Piedmont Baptist College in an exhibition game on November 10 by a final score of 28–7. The game did not count in their final record as Baptist competed as a club sport prior to transitioning to Division III in 1991.

Schedule

References

Davidson
Davidson Wildcats football seasons
Davidson Wildcats football